Abu Musa Airport  is a regional airport located in near of city of Abu Musa, Hormozgan Province, in south of Iran in Persian Gulf.

Airlines and destinations

Facilities

References

External links
 

Airports in Iran
Transportation in Hormozgan Province
Buildings and structures in Hormozgan Province